Parliamentary elections were held in Serbia on 12 December 1880. As expected, the elections resulted in a majority for the government, whose supporters won 94 seats, whilst Radicals won only 18 seats. By January 1881 the number of government supporters had risen to over 100, whilst the Radicals had split.

Background
Prince Milan signed a decree dissolving the National Assembly and calling elections on 5 November. Unlike the previous elections in which many candidates were returned unopposed, most seats were contested.

References

1880 in Serbia
1880 elections in Europe
1880
December 1880 events